Ulrich Eicke (born 18 February 1952 in Wuppertal) is a West German sprint canoeist who competed from the mid-1970s to the mid-1980s. Competing in two Summer Olympics, he won the gold in the C-1 1000 m event at Los Angeles in 1984.

Eicke also earned three silver medals at the ICF Canoe Sprint World Championships (C-1 500 m: 1977, 1979; C-1 1000 m: 1985).

References

Sports-reference.com profile

1952 births
Canoeists at the 1976 Summer Olympics
Canoeists at the 1984 Summer Olympics
German male canoeists
Living people
Olympic canoeists of West Germany
Olympic gold medalists for West Germany
Olympic medalists in canoeing
ICF Canoe Sprint World Championships medalists in Canadian

Medalists at the 1984 Summer Olympics
Sportspeople from Wuppertal